Barkers Creek is a locality in central Victoria, Australia. It is essentially an extension of the larger town of Castlemaine, nearby to the south.

References

External links

Towns in Victoria (Australia)